El cuarto mandamiento (English: The fourth commandment), is a Mexican telenovela produced by Televisa and originally transmitted by Telesistema Mexicano.

Cast 
Guillermo Zetina
Pituka de Foronda
Gloria Leticia Ortiz
Lupita Lara

References

External links 

Mexican telenovelas
Televisa telenovelas
Spanish-language telenovelas
1967 telenovelas
1967 Mexican television series debuts
1967 Mexican television series endings